The 1976 Chattanooga Moccasins football team was an American football team that represented the University of Tennessee at Chattanooga as an independent during the 1976 NCAA Division II football season. In their fourth year under head coach Joe Morrison, the team compiled a 6–4–1 record.

Schedule

References

Chattanooga
Chattanooga Mocs football seasons
Chattanooga Moccasins football